Qaleh-ye Sardar or Qaleh Sardar or Qaleh-e Sardar may refer to:
 Qaleh Sardar, Fars
 Qaleh-ye Sardar, Khuzestan
 Qaleh Sardar, West Azerbaijan